The (Anti-)Superhuman Restraint Unit is a fictional special operations unit of S.H.I.E.L.D. appearing in American comic books published by Marvel Comics, designed by penciller Howard Chaykin.

History

Beetles 

An armored superhuman restraint unit's first appearance in the Marvel Universe was in Marvel UK's The Mighty World Of Marvel, during the events of the Jaspers' Warp story arc involving Brian Braddock as Captain Britain. Insane reality warper Mad Jim Jaspers is the Prime Minister of the United Kingdom and turned the UK into a fascist state, and enforced "Super Hero Legislation" using armored agents of S.T.R.I.K.E. (the UK division of S.H.I.E.L.D.) to hunt down and detain superhumans within the UK. These anti-superhuman agents were called "Beetles" squadrons due to their beetle head shaped helmets and were best known for gunning down Tom Lennox, Betsy Braddock's lover.

Cape-Killers 
The Cape-Killers (sometimes written Capekiller) are agents of S.H.I.E.L.D. equipped in armored suits during the events of Marvel Comics' Civil War crossover, where these agents were sent to bring in rogue superheroes. The United States government passed the Superhuman Registration Act, and used a division of S.H.I.E.L.D. agents trained to deal specifically with superhuman threats, to enforce the law. These foot soldiers of S.H.I.E.L.D., known as (Anti-)Superhuman Restraint Unit and more commonly Cape-Killers, were spread out across Marvel comics and came into conflict with various superpowered individuals throughout the event. The Cape-Killers wear armor and use hardware designed by Stark Industries. The Cape-Killers' armor has two different styles of helmet (a Riotsquad style helmet, and a helmet with a Filter style gas mask) as well as suits that are out-fitted with internal comm systems, and hover discs that give the wearers the ability of flight (which have been seen in various comics), and various firearms that shot tranquilizer darts, though later they have been shown to use genetic paralyzer laser weapons. Weaknesses of the Cape-Killers' armor suits have been shown to be susceptible to power surges in several issues, and S.H.I.E.L.D. former director Nick Fury would later develop a device that transmitted an electromagnetic overload pulse-broadcast straight into their comm systems which shut down their suits and frying their electrical systems that was shown to take down several unit members at once. It's also shown that there's an override code used by Kenny, a disillusioned employee of Stark Industries and a designer of the Cape-Killer armor, on his high tech palm pilot that can freeze the suits. The Cape-Killers are seen in the subsequent Initiative story arc as well as the Secret Invasion storyline, until H.A.M.M.E.R. commander Norman Osborn discontinues the Cape-Killers' technology.

Known teams and members

Cape-Killers 
9-6 - an unlicensed hero recovery team.
Agent Abrams - the leader of a unit to capture Robert "Nitro" Hunter which failed and died when they were caught in an explosion generated by Nitro.
Agent Cleery
Agent Doug ??? and another Cape-Killer - Security for the Santa Monica Farmers' Market.
Aerial Company C & Aerial Company E - Posted in the Manhattan area follow the events of World War Hulk.
Dum Dum Dugan
Force Unit 9 - Avengers Tower Guards.
Major Tom Aramaki - The leader of a mecha unit.
Team Cobra - which included Commander Gabriel Jones and Agent Whitman
Team 1 & Team 2 - assigned to the Baxter Building.
Special Agent Marquez and her partner Agent McAllister

In other media

Television
An amalgamated version of the Superhuman Restraint Unit appears in the Avengers Assemble episode "Civil War, Part 3: The Drums of War". This version, designed by Truman Marsh, sports the Beetles' colors and the Cape-Killers' advanced technology.

Video games
The Superhuman Restraint Unit appears in Marvel Ultimate Alliance 2, as enemies if the player chooses the story's Anti-Registration side, and as allies if the player chooses the story's Pro-Registration side.

See also
Superhuman Tactical Activities Response Squad

References

S.H.I.E.L.D.